The Milavce culture was a Bronze Age culture, part of the Urnfield culture. Its type site is Milavče in the Czech Republic.

Urnfield culture
Archaeological cultures of Central Europe
Bronze Age cultures of Europe
Articles needing translation from Polish Wikipedia
Archaeological cultures in the Czech Republic